The Grand Canyon Lodge is a hotel and cabins complex at Bright Angel Point on the North Rim of the Grand Canyon.  It was designed by Gilbert Stanley Underwood, who designed a number of other hotels in national parks for the Utah Parks Company and other concessioners. Built in 1927–28, the Grand Canyon Lodge resort complex consists of the Main Lodge building, 23 deluxe cabins, and 91 standard cabins, some of which were moved to the north rim campground in 1940. All guests are housed in cabins detached from the main lodge, which serves as a dining, concessions and service facility. Constructed of native Kaibab limestone and timber, the complex was designed to harmonize with its rocky and forested setting. The Grand Canyon Lodge complex is notable for its setting and rustic design, as well as its status as the only complete surviving lodge and cabin complex in the national parks.

History
The new hotel complex on the North Rim was built in 1927–28 by the Utah Parks Company, a subsidiary of the Union Pacific Railroad, which operated similar concessions in Zion and Bryce Canyon National Parks. Until then, most of the concession activity on the North Rim was at the camp run by W.W. Wylie, a concessioner more closely associated with Yellowstone National Park, who operated the tent camp that eventually became the Grand Canyon Inn and Campground after it was taken over by the Utah Parks Company.

The Grand Canyon Lodge initially consisted of the Main Lodge building, 20 deluxe cabins, and 100 standard cabins. 20 additional cabins were constructed in 1928. The lodge and many of the cabins were built in the fall and winter of 1927–28, in a region known for its severe winter weather. Cabin construction continued through the summer of 1928. A 1932 fire that began in the lodge's basement destroyed much of the main lodge and two cabins. The lodge was rebuilt in 1936–37 to a modified design, that re-used much of the original stonework, but which was otherwise scaled back, lacking the original's second story and observation tower. Underwood increased the amount of stonework and modified the roofline in response to the original lodge's experience of heavy snowfall. Debate continues over the role Underwood played, if any, in the rebuilt Grand Canyon Lodge, as he was by then working for the Federal government, and his signature is not apparent on the reconstruction drawings.

Description
Gilbert Stanley Underwood was employed by the Union Pacific Railroad to design resort hotels at Zion, Bryce Canyon, Yosemite, and Grand Canyon.  Underwood purposefully designed the stonework to appear like natural rock outcroppings. The main lodge building is set slightly downhill into the side of the canyon and is the complex's central feature. The structure of both the original and rebuilt lodges is a mixture of Kaibab limestone and peeled Ponderosa pine logs.

The original lodge was a shallow U-shaped structure featured the central south-facing Sun Room with large windows and open stone terraces to either side. The east terrace featured an outdoor stone fireplace. The dining room ran along the western terrace with a bank of windows overlooking the canyon and a dramatic log truss roof augmented by concealed steel reinforcement. The eastern wing was a two-story structure with a recreation room on the lower level and a female employee dormitory on the upper level. The roof of the Sun Room was a terrace that stepped up into the main lobby, which was itself capped with an observation tower. The wings held bathing facilities, gift shops and a soda fountain, with a basement containing service areas, and a large room below the Sun Room. The original lodge, with its shallow roof, expressed California design influences, with elements of Spanish Revival style.

The rebuilt lodge maintained the same general outline, but was simplified and strengthened against the severe winter snow loads of the North Rim. The Dining Room was reconstructed largely as it was before, but with a steeper roof pitch, and the Recreation room received similar treatment, without the original upper level, and on a smaller scale than the Dining Room. Compared with the original there was greater use of stone throughout the lodge. The Sun Room was rebuilt in the same relationship to the lobby as before. The reconstruction included wrought iron hardware and lighting fixtures that complement the rustic wood and stone structure. The overall effect of the reconstructed lodge was one of more strongly expressed rustic character.

Cabins
All guest accommodation at the Grand Canyon Lodge was and remains in small detached cabins, arranged in duplex or quadplex plans. Cabins fell into two categories: Regular and Deluxe. The regular cabins, sometimes called economy cabins, were built as true log cabins with gabled roofs, each of two rooms divided by a log wall with a door. Located to the northwest of the lodge, 91 of these were built. 46 were altered with a bathroom extension of simulated log construction with a toilet for each side, while most of the remainder had single shared bathrooms built inside. Each cabin has an unroofed stone porch at either end. The deluxe cabins, located to the northeast of the lodge, are frame structures sheathed with half-logs. 18 are duplexes (another two burned when the lodge burned and were never replaced) and five are quadplexes. Floor plans and porch arrangements vary. All deluxe cabins share prominent porches of heavy log construction, many of which are on the edge of the canyon and have their own views. Deluxe cabins included stone chimneys. The regular cabins are still in use, divided into cabins that retain the original layout, and renovated cabins that combine both rooms into one larger cabin.

The cabin complex is significant in its retention of both classes of cabins. At other parks the cabins have either been removed, or the economy cabins have vanished, or, as at Zion, the main lodge has been destroyed.

Historic designation
The Grand Canyon Lodge was declared a National Historic Landmark on May 28, 1987. It had previously been placed on the National Register of Historic Places on  September 2, 1982. The historic district includes a rustic drinking fountain and a trail shelter near the head of the North Kaibab Trail.

References

External links

 Architecture in the Parks: A National Historic Landmark Theme Study: Grand Canyon Lodge, by Laura Soullière Harrison, 1986, at National Park Service.
 Grand Canyon Lodge Photos
  and Grand Canyon Lodge, Bright Angel Kiosk, North Rim, Grand Canyon, Coconino County, AZ
 
 Official website

Hotels in Arizona
Grand Canyon, North Rim
Buildings and structures in Grand Canyon National Park
Railway hotels in the United States
Hotel buildings completed in 1928
Hotel buildings on the National Register of Historic Places in Arizona
Park buildings and structures on the National Register of Historic Places in Arizona
National Register of Historic Places in Coconino County, Arizona
National Historic Landmarks in Arizona
Hotels established in 1928
1928 establishments in Arizona
Grand Canyon
Historic American Buildings Survey in Arizona
Buildings and structures in Coconino County, Arizona
Tourist attractions in Coconino County, Arizona
Gilbert Stanley Underwood buildings
National Park Service rustic in Arizona
Historic districts on the National Register of Historic Places in Arizona
National Register of Historic Places in Grand Canyon National Park